Teracotona is a genus of moths in the family Erebidae from the Afrotropics. The genus was erected by Arthur Gardiner Butler in 1878.

Species

Subgenus Teracotona Butler, 1878 

Teracotona euprepia Hampson, 1900
Teracotona euprepia bicolor Toulgoët, 1980
Teracotona euprepioides Wichgraf, 1921
Teracotona pardalina Bartel, 1903
Teracotona quadripunctata Wichgraf, 1908 (=buryi Rothschild, 1910)
Teracotona rhodophaea (Walker, [1865])
Teracotona submaculata (Walker, 1855)
Teracotona trifasciata Bartel, 1903

Subgenus Neoteracotona Dubatolov, 2009 

Teracotona alicia (Hampson, 1911)
Teracotona jacksoni (Rothschild, 1910)
Teracotona kovtunovitchi Dubatolov, 2011
Teracotona murtafaa Wiltshire, 1980
Teracotona pallida Joicey & Talbot, 1924
Teracotona pitmanni (Rothschild, 1933)
Teracotona pitmani major (Rothschild, 1933)
Teracotona postalbida Gaede, 1926
Teracotona proditrix Berio, 1939
Teracotona pruinosa de Joannis, 1912
Teracotona translucens (Grünberg, 1907)

Subgenus Pseudoteracotona Dubatolov, 2009 

Teracotona abyssinica (Rothschild, 1933)
Teracotona approximans (Rothschild, 1917)
Teracotona clara Holland, 1892
Teracotona clara rubiginea(Toulgoët, 1977)
Teracotona immaculata (Wichgraf, 1921)
Teracotona melanocera (Hampson, 1920)
Teracotona metaxantha (Hampson, 1920)
Teracotona multistrigata Joicey & Talbot, 1924
Teracotona neumanni (Rothschild, 1933)
Teracotona seminigra (Hampson, 1905)
Teracotona senegalensis (Rothschild, 1933)
Teracotona subapproximans (Rothschild, 1933)
Teracotona subterminata (Hampson, 1901)
Teracotona uhrikmeszarosi Szent-Ivany, 1942
Teracotona wittei (Debauche, 1942)

Teracotona sensu lato 

Teracotona homeyeri Rothschild, 1910
Teracotona latifasciata Carcasson, 1965

Incorrectly placed species
Teracotona mirabilis - transferred into Lithosiinae

References

 , 2009: Reviewing the African tiger-moth genera: 1. A new genus, two new subgenera and a species list from the expedition to Malawi by V.Kovtunovich & P. Usthjuzhanin in 2008–2009, with further taxonomic notes on South African Arctiinae (Lepidoptera, Arctiidae: Arctiinae). Atalanta 40 (1/2): 285–301, 352-355 (colour plates 24-27).
 , 2011: Arctiinae from African expeditions of V. Kovtunovich & P. Ustjuzhanin in 2009–2011, with description of new taxa and taxonomic notes (Lepidoptera, Arctiidae). Atalanta 42 (1/2): 125–135.

Spilosomina
Moth genera